Paris-Michael Katherine Jackson (born April 3, 1998) is an American model, actress, and singer. She is the second child and only daughter of Michael Jackson and Debbie Rowe.

In 2020, Jackson signed a deal with Republic Records. Her first single, "Let Down", was released on October 29, 2020. Her debut album, Wilted, was released on November 18, 2020.

Life and career

1998–2009: Early life

Jackson was born on April 3, 1998, at Spaulding Pain Medical Clinic in Beverly Hills, California, and was named after the French capital city in which she was conceived. Her name also comes from a promise that her father, aunt La Toya, and Kathy Hilton made when they were younger that if they were to have a daughter, they would name her Paris. She is the middle child and only daughter of singer Michael Jackson and younger child of Debbie Rowe. She has one older brother named Michael Joseph Jackson, Jr. ("Prince") and one younger half-brother named Prince Michael Jackson II ("Bigi", formerly known as "Blanket"). Paris was raised solely by her father, who received full custody rights following his and Rowe's divorce in 2000; Rowe had stated it was her intention and agreed upon with Michael that he would raise and have custody of the children. Reports alleged that the relationship was an "economic" transaction for Rowe while Jackson wanted a baby. She grew up at Neverland Ranch with her siblings. Her father made Elizabeth Taylor and Macaulay Culkin the godparents of her and her brother Prince. During her childhood, she and her siblings often wore masks during public outings with their father to hide their faces from the public and press.

Paris's father unexpectedly died on June 25, 2009, leaving her and her siblings in the custody of their grandmother and cousin Tito Joe Jackson ("TJ") son of Tito Jackson. On July 7, 2009, during the televised memorial for Michael, then 11-year-old Jackson concluded the service saying "I just wanted to say, ever since I was born, Daddy has been the best father you could ever imagine" Consoled by her aunts, uncles and grandmother she continued "And I just wanted to say I love him so much," before she burst into tears and threw herself into aunt Janet Jackson's arms.

2010–2018: Career beginnings
In 2010, Jackson and her brothers gave an interview for Oprah Winfrey alongside their grandmother Katherine and their cousins about life after her father's death. She and her brother Prince also accepted the Lifetime Achievement Award at the 2010 Grammy Awards on their father's behalf. Jackson enrolled at the Buckley School, an exclusive private school in Sherman Oaks, California, along with her brother Prince. There, she participated in flag football, softball, and cheerleading.

In 2011, Jackson signed on to star in the children's fantasy film, Lundon's Bridge and the Three Keys, a story adapted from a book written by Dennis Christen. Ultimately, the film was not produced.

Jackson, her two siblings Prince and Bigi, and her grandmother Katherine made plans to put together a documentary film entitled Remembering Michael in remembrance of her deceased father. It had been hoped that costs associated with the making of the project were to be funded via contributing fans through the crowdfunding site FundAnything. However, due to the uproar from the fans and media sparked by this method, Katherine decided to shut down the campaign. In a sneak peek of the documentary, Paris remarked that her father had promised to teach her his famous dance move, the Moonwalk, but never had the chance. Since the shut down of the online campaign, no further updates have been reported concerning this project.

In January 2017, Jackson appeared on the cover of Rolling Stone.

In March 2017, Jackson signed a modeling contract with IMG Models. Also in March, Jackson made her acting debut with a guest starring role on FOX's Star.

Jackson made her feature film debut in Gringo in 2018.

She and musician/singer Gabriel Glenn formed a musical duo called The Soundflowers and performed their first gig at Canyon Sessions on June 23, 2018, with original songs "Daisy" and "In the Blue". Jackson sings and plays the ukulele while Glenn also sings and plays acoustic guitar. The Soundflowers released their first self-titled EP on 24 June 2020.

2019–present
On June 24, 2019, the eve of the 10th anniversary of her father's death, it was confirmed that Jackson would make an appearance in the third season of the VH1 television series Scream. Jackson then appeared in Habit, portraying Jesus Christ. Jackson also signed a deal with Republic Records. Her first single, "Let Down", was released on October 29, 2020, as well as the music video for the song. Her debut album, Wilted, was released on November 18, 2020.

In 2021 the song "Notes on a ghost" performed by Paris Jackson and Gabriel Glenn won the Best Music award at the Top Indie Film Awards. The song was part of the soundtrack of the film The Passenger which was directed by Alexander Bruckner. On April 22, 2021, it was reported that Jackson joined the cast of the tenth season of the FX anthology horror series, American Horror Story in an undisclosed role. She starred as Maya in the first story of the American Horror Story spinoff series, American Horror Stories, which premiered July 15, 2021.

On June 12, 2022, Jackson attended the 75th Tony Awards with her brother Prince in support of the Broadway musical MJ the Musical and lead actor Myles Frost who won the Tony Award for Best Actor in a Musical. Frost won the Tony Award for portraying Jackson's father Michael Jackson. MJ the Musical won a total of four awards that night. Jackson and Prince introduced a performance from the musical. Both siblings attended the opening night of the musical at the Neil Simon Theatre in New York along with cousin TJ, son of Tito of the Jackson 5. 

On February 18, 2022, Paris shared the Lost EP. The EP includes a collaboration with Caamp called "Lost", and solo songs "Breathe Again" and "Never Going Back Again". In June 2022, Jackson released the single and the following music video to "Lighthouse". The video has a 1990s-rock grunge vibe that pays homage to Nirvana and Kurt Cobain. On October 28, 2022, Jackson released a single titled "Just You".

Personal life
Jackson has said that she is multiracial, but considers herself black and that she was immersed in African-American culture by her father Michael.

By the age of 15, she had been an intravenous drug addict and had attempted suicide several times. She was then sent to a therapeutic school in Utah, where she spent her sophomore and junior years of high school, and which she originally credited with helping her overcome depression. However, in October 2020, Jackson revealed the school had actually subjected her and the other students to extensive abuse. The revelation came in response to Paris Hilton's documentary This Is Paris, in which Jackson describes being verbally, physically, and sexually abused at Provo Canyon School, a therapeutic school in Provo, Utah. Jackson posted to her Instagram account, “I stand with @ParisHilton & all the survivors. ... As a girl who also went to a behavior modification ‘boarding school’ for almost two years as a teenager, and has since been diagnosed with PTSD because of it, and continue to have nightmares and trust issues, I stand with @ParisHilton and the other survivors. The other girls I’m still friends with to this day that went to the boarding school with me all have the same symptoms of PTSD and nightmares and trust issues. This is child abuse. ... Let’s start with Provo and keep going from there."

On July 13, 2018, in response to a question on her Instagram profile about whether she is bisexual, she wrote: "That's what you guys call it so I (sic) guess but who needs labels." She later added to Twitter: "Everyone has known for years I came out when I was 14, WTF." and "How many times have I publicly referred to the community as 'my fellow LGBTQ+'? Like, even on stage. I've been a part of the community for years. I even mentioned having crushes on girls when I was eight in a magazine before. I've been caught kissing girls in public." Again, she added to her Instagram page: "And I'm not bisexual, I just love people for people."

In March 2019, TMZ posted an article stating Jackson had attempted suicide by cutting her wrists earlier in the month and was placed on a psychiatric hold. The story was picked up by a number of other media outlets. Jackson denied the suicide attempt, writing to TMZ on Twitter "fuck you you fucking liars" and "lies lies lies omg and more lies."

On May 31, 2020, Jackson joined the protests after George Floyd's murder in solidarity with Black Lives Matter. She posted a photo of herself on Instagram holding a sign that read "Peace,Love,Justice".

In July 2020, Jackson discussed her sexuality in her docuseries, Unfiltered: Paris Jackson & Gabriel Glenn, in which Jackson stated "Never thought I'd end up with a dude; thought I'd end up marrying a chick or..." She also stated that she has "dated more women than men" but that she "wouldn't consider myself bisexual because I've dated more than just men and women; I've dated a man that had a vagina."

On June 16, 2021, Jackson appeared on the Facebook Watch show Red Table Talk, where she was interviewed by her friend Willow Smith. Jackson said that she experiences PTSD as a result of being followed by paparazzi, but her mental health has since improved since her past of depression, and that she has found more joy and ways to cope. Music, practicing affirmations and therapy helps her.

Jackson is an ambassador for the Elizabeth Taylor AIDS Foundation and Heal Los Angeles Foundation to help people in need. She began modeling to grow her platform and draw more attention to activism.

Discography

Studio albums

Extended plays

Singles

Guest appearances

Filmography

Film

Television

Music videos

Awards and nominations

References

External links
 
 
 

1998 births
21st-century American actresses
African-American actresses
African-American female models
American female models
American film actresses
American LGBT actors
American television actresses
Female models from California
IMG Models models
Paris Jackson
LGBT actresses
LGBT African Americans
LGBT models
LGBT people from California
LGBT women
Living people
Michael Jackson
People from Beverly Hills, California
People from Los Angeles
People with post-traumatic stress disorder